SS New England may refer to:
 , a Design 1023 cargo ship built for the United States Shipping Board
  (ex-New England, ex-Romanic), a passenger steamship built in 1898

Ship names